Tom Van Vleck is an American computer software engineer.

Life and work
Van Vleck graduated from MIT in 1965 with a BS in Mathematics. He worked on CTSS at MIT, and co-authored its first email program with Noel Morris. In 1965, he joined Project MAC, the predecessor of the MIT Computer Science and Artificial Intelligence Laboratory. He worked on the development of Multics for more than 16 years at MIT and at Honeywell Information Systems. He has also worked at Tandem Computers, Taligent, CyberCash, Sun Microsystems, Encirq (an internet advertising company), and SPARTA (a computer security company). 

He is also known as a computer security expert.

Notes

Bibliography
 Operational changes for MR 4.0, T. H. Van Vleck, MULTICS OPERATING STAFF NOTE MOSN-A001, Honeywell, April 23, 1976
 The Multics System Programming Process, Van Vleck, T. H. and Clingen, C. T.; Invited Paper, ICSE 1978, pp. 278–280
 Getting the picture; it can be done, IEEE Computer, vol. 27, no. 5, pp. 112, May 1994
 SPMA - Java Binary Enhancement Tool, DARPA Information Survivability Conference and Exposition - Volume II, pp. 152, April 2003; (DOI)
 Self-Protecting Mobile Agents Obfuscation Report, L. D'Anna, B. Matt, A. Reisse, T. Van Vleck, S. Schwab, and P. LeBlanc, Report #03-015, Network Associates Laboratories, June 2003.
 Anti-Phishing: Best Practices for Institutions and Consumers; Tally, Gregg; Thomas, Roshan; Van Vleck, Tom; McAfee Research, Technical Report # 04-004
 Three Questions about Each Bug You Find, Software Engineering Notes 14:5:62-63 (July 1989)
 Cleaning Up the Basement in the Dark, Software Engineering Notes, (April 1992)
 --, ed., with David Walden, The Compatible Time Sharing System (1961-1973) Fiftieth Anniversary Commemorative Overview, (also at Multicians.org) IEEE Computer Society, 2011
 The IBM 7094 and CTSS
 The IBM 360/67 and CP/CMS
 The IBM 7070
 1401s I have Known

References
 The Multics web site, Mirror of multicians.org
 Tom Van Vleck's home page
 Tom Van Vleck, "THVV Multics Bio", Multicians.org, most recent update 11/29/02
 Jeffrey R. Yost, "An Interview with Thomas Van Vleck", 24 October 2012, Computer Security History Project, Charles Babbage Institute

Computer systems engineers
American software engineers
Software engineering researchers
Computer security academics
American computer programmers
Massachusetts Institute of Technology School of Science alumni
Multics people
Living people
Year of birth missing (living people)